Oskari Sakari Kari Korpikari (born 5 April 1984) is a Finnish professional ice hockey defenceman who currently plays for Jokerit in the SM-liiga.  He was selected by the Montreal Canadiens in the 7th round (217th overall) of the 2003 NHL Entry Draft.

Career statistics

Regular season and playoffs

International

References

External links

1984 births
Espoo Blues players
Hokki players
Oulun Kärpät players
Living people
Montreal Canadiens draft picks
Lahti Pelicans players
People from Kempele
Jokerit players
Finnish ice hockey defencemen
Sportspeople from North Ostrobothnia